The Saline River is a  tributary of the Smoky Hill River in the central Great Plains of North America. The entire length of the river lies in the U.S. state of Kansas in the northwest part of the state. Its name comes from the French translation of its Native name Ne Miskua, referring to its salty content.

Geography
The Saline River originates in the High Plains of northwestern Kansas. The south fork of the river rises near the Sherman County-Thomas County line while its north fork rises in central Thomas County. It flows east for  through the Smoky Hills region of north-central Kansas and joins the Smoky Hill River approximately 1 mile south of New Cambria, Kansas in Saline County. The Saline is sluggish and unnavigable with no major tributaries and has a riverbed of sand and mud.

The combined Smoky Hill-Saline Basin drains . Via the Smoky Hill, Kansas, and Missouri Rivers, it is part of the Mississippi River watershed.

In Russell County, the river is dammed to form Wilson Lake.

The course of the Saline River runs through these counties:
 Thomas County, Kansas
 Sheridan County, Kansas
 Graham County, Kansas
 Trego County, Kansas
 Ellis County, Kansas
 Russell County, Kansas
 Lincoln County, Kansas
 Ottawa County, Kansas
 Saline County, Kansas

History
The first recorded reference to the Saline River was on October 18, 1724, by French explorer Etienne Venyard de Bourgmont who reported finding a "small river where the water was briny". Bourgmont was on his way to negotiate a peace treaty with the Padouca whose "Grand Village" was then located on the Saline's banks. In 1806, an American expedition led by Zebulon Pike crossed the river on its way to visit the Pawnee. By 1817, the river was known as the "Grand Saline".

The Pawnee and the Kanza, who used the area as hunting and trapping ground, claimed land along the Saline until the 1850s when American settlers began to arrive. The Kansas–Nebraska Act of 1854 established Kansas Territory, which included the entire length of the Saline River.  By 1873, the U.S. government had forcibly removed the Kanza to a reservation in Indian Territory (now Oklahoma).

In August 1867, Cheyenne warriors massacred a party of railroad workers in Ellis County, an incident which led to a battle between the Cheyenne and Buffalo Soldiers from Fort Hays that became known as "The Battle of the Saline River".

The Saline River flooded periodically during the late 19th century with particularly destructive floods occurring in 1858, 1867, and 1903. In 1964, the U.S. Army Corps of Engineers dammed the river in eastern Russell County for flood control, creating Wilson Lake.

See also
List of Kansas rivers
Smoky Hill River
Smoky Hills
Wilson Lake (Kansas)

References

Rivers of Ellis County, Kansas
Rivers of Graham County, Kansas
Rivers of Lincoln County, Kansas
Rivers of Ottawa County, Kansas
Rivers of Kansas
Rivers of Russell County, Kansas
Rivers of Sheridan County, Kansas
Rivers of Thomas County, Kansas
Rivers of Trego County, Kansas
Tributaries of the Kansas River